Martin Davies (born 1965) is a British author. His most recent work includes Havana Sleeping (2014), The Year After (2011),  The Unicorn Road (2009),and a book about Joseph Banks and the Mysterious Bird of Ulieta, entitled The Conjuror's Bird (2005). He is also the author of three mystery novels about Sherlock Holmes' housekeeper Mrs. Hudson: Mrs. Hudson and the Spirits' Curse (2004), Mrs. Hudson and the Malabar Rose (2005), and Mrs. Hudson and the Lazarus Testament (2015).

In 2015, his espionage thriller Havana Sleeping was shortlisted for the CWA Historical Dagger Award.

References

External links
Martin Davies Profile at Hodder & Stoughton

21st-century British novelists
British television producers
Living people
British male novelists
21st-century British male writers
1965 births